Redland-Victoria Point Sharks Football Club (nicknamed The Sharks) is a Brisbane based sports club. The Australian rules football team competes in the Queensland Australian Football League (QAFL) since 2021. They have previously been a part of both the AFL Queensland State League and the North East Australian Football League (NEAFL).

Apart from football, Reland Sharks has cricket, netball, softball, and fishing sections.

History

Beginning
Primarily named "Victoria Point Australian Football Club", it was founded in 1966 by Mr Ern Dowling. In 1970 the club changed its name to the "Victoria Point Redlands Australian Football Club". In 1972 a further name change took place and the club was now known as "Redlands Australian Football Club". The club won senior premierships in the South Queensland Football Association Division One – 199899 (2 total); SQFA Division Two – 1975, 1987 (2 total).

AFLQ

In 2000 Redland joined the elite AFL Queensland State League and in 2002 the club formally linked as a sister club with the AFL's Essendon Football Club. The "Redland Sharks" name was exchanged for the "Redland Bombers" and the players wore the same guernsey as Essendon.

Yet to win its first AFLQ premiership, Redland won three wooden spoons from 2005 to 2007 but has been highly competitive since 2009 playing off in four NEAFL finals series, making the semi finals consecutively in 2012 and 2013.

In 2020, Redland Bombers merged with the Victoria Point Sharks to form "'Redland-Victoria Point Sharks Football Club". The newly merged club joined AFL Queensland to play in the Queensland Australian Football League since 2021.

Honours

Grogan Medallists
 2001, Paul O'Brien
 2012, Thomas Salter

AFLQ Top Goalkickers
 2001, Paul O'Brien (113)

Notable players

 Charlie Dixon – 185* games for Gold Coast Suns and Port Adelaide Football Club
 Brad Howard – (Saint Kilda, 2007)
 Sam Michael – (Brisbane Lions 2011 rookie)
 Paul O'Shea – (Western Bulldogs, 2007)
 Adam Oxley – (Collingwood 2012 rookie)
 Alex Sexton (Gold Coast Suns 2011)
 Jake Spencer – (Melbourne, 2008).
 Josh Thomas – (Collingwood 2009)
 Michael West – (Western Bulldogs, 2005)

References

External links

 

Redland Bombers FC
1966 establishments in Australia
Australian rules football clubs established in 1966